Steuber is a surname of German origin, meaning "to whip up dust". Notable people with the surname include:

Bob Steuber (1921-1996), American football halfback
Tiffany Steuber (born 1977), Canadian curler

See also
Stuber (disambiguation)

Surnames of German origin